Alexander Williams Jr. (born May 8, 1948) is a former United States district judge of the United States District Court for the District of Maryland.

Education and career

Born in Washington, D.C., Williams received a Bachelor of Arts degree from Howard University in 1970 and a Juris Doctor from Howard University School of Law in 1973. He was a law clerk for Judge James H. Taylor, Seventh Judicial Circuit of Maryland from 1973 to 1974. He was in private practice in Hyattsville, Maryland and Beltsville, Maryland from 1974 to 1986, serving as a municipal attorney for Fairmount Heights from 1975 to 1987, and as a substitute juvenile master, Prince George's County Circuit Court (part-time) from 1976 to 1977. He was an Assistant public defender, Prince George's County Public Defender's Office from 1977 to 1978. He was a Special counsel and hearing examiner, Prince George's County Board of Education (part-time) from 1978 to 1987. He became a professor of law at Howard University from 1978 to 1989, continuing as an adjunct professor thereafter. He was a Municipal attorney of Glenarden from 1980 to 1987, and was then a State's attorney of Prince George's County from 1987 to 1994. Alexander Williams Jr. was the first African American elected to the office of State's Attorney in Prince George's County, Maryland.

Federal judicial service

On August 6, 1993, President Bill Clinton nominated Williams to a seat on the United States District Court for the District of Maryland vacated by Judge Norman P. Ramsey. Williams was confirmed by the United States Senate on August 17, 1994, and received his commission on August 18, 1994. He took senior status on May 8, 2013. He retired from active service on January 3, 2014.

See also 
 List of African-American federal judges
 List of African-American jurists

References

Sources

1948 births
Living people
African-American judges
Judges of the United States District Court for the District of Maryland
United States district court judges appointed by Bill Clinton
Public defenders
Howard University alumni
Howard University School of Law alumni
People from Washington, D.C.
20th-century American judges
State's attorneys in Maryland
Howard University School of Law faculty
21st-century American judges